ramaz nozadze (born 16 October 1981, in Tbilisi) is a Georgian wrestler who competed in the Men's Greco-Roman 96 kg at the 2004 Summer Olympics and won the silver medal. He lost in the final match to Karam Gaber by (1-12).

References

External links
 

Male sport wrestlers from Georgia (country)
Wrestlers at the 2004 Summer Olympics
Wrestlers at the 2008 Summer Olympics
1983 births
Living people
Sportspeople from Tbilisi
Olympic wrestlers of Georgia (country)
Olympic silver medalists for Georgia (country)
Olympic medalists in wrestling
Medalists at the 2004 Summer Olympics
World Wrestling Championships medalists
21st-century people from Georgia (country)